Shake It Up & Other Hits is a budget compilation album of the Cars' songs, released by Rhino Records in 2001.

Track listing

Personnel
 Elliot Easton – lead guitar, backing vocals
 Greg Hawkes – keyboard, backing vocals
 Ric Ocasek – rhythm guitar, lead vocals on 1, 3, 4, 6, 7, 9
 Benjamin Orr – bass guitar, lead vocals on 2, 5, 8, 10
 David Robinson – drums, percussion

References

2001 compilation albums
The Cars compilation albums
Albums produced by Robert John "Mutt" Lange
Albums produced by Roy Thomas Baker
Albums produced by Mike Shipley
Rhino Records compilation albums